Justice Simpson may refer to:

Gordon Simpson (judge) (1894–1987), associate justice of the Texas Supreme Court
Robert Tennent Simpson Jr. (1893–1974), associate justice of the Alabama Supreme Court
David F. Simpson (1860–1925), associate justice of the Minnesota Supreme Court
George B. Simpson (c. 1882–1954), associate justice of the Washington Supreme Court
Jesse L. Simpson (1884–1973), chief justice of the Illinois Supreme Court
R. T. Simpson (1837–1912), associate justice of the Alabama Supreme Court
William Dunlap Simpson (1823–1890), chief justice of the South Carolina Supreme Court

See also
Judge Simpson (disambiguation)